Alonso Ancira Elizondo (born 1956) is a Mexican businessman who is the controlling shareholder and chairman of Altos Hornos de Mexico (AHMSA). He purchased AHMSA from the Mexican Government in 1991, when the government privatized the steel industry. In March 2006, he was elected as president of the  Iron and Steel Mexican Chamber (CANACERO) for the years 2006-2007.

Ancira was arrested in Spain by the Interpol in May 2019 in connection with the 2014 sale of a fertilizer plant to PEMEX, the Mexican-state oil company. According to bank records he is bankrupt and is billions in debt. Ancira and other family members have been charged with corruption, money laundering, fraud and other crimes; he bribed with two million dollars Emilio Lozoya. The bank accounts of Altos Hornos and Emilio Lozoya Austin, the former CEO of PEMEX, were frozen 24 hours earlier.

In a November 2020 interview with Carlos Loret de Mola, Ancira offered to reimburse the US $200 million he cheated the Mexican government out of if President Andrés Manuel López Obrador agreed to stop insulting him. AMLO replied, “Yes, I'm offering an apology, now just return the 200 million dollars."

See also
Monclova

References

External links
 NY Times Article
 Internet Securities Creditors want Alonso Ancira out of AHMSA.
 Altos Hornos de Mexico Website

1956 births
Living people
Institutional Revolutionary Party politicians
People from Coahuila
Mexican businesspeople